The 157th Massachusetts General Court, consisting of the Massachusetts Senate and the Massachusetts House of Representatives, met in 1951 and 1952 during the governorship of Paul A. Dever. Richard I. Furbush served as president of the Senate and Tip O'Neill served as speaker of the House.

Senators

Representatives

See also
 1952 Massachusetts gubernatorial election
 82nd United States Congress
 List of Massachusetts General Courts

References

Further reading

External links

 
 
 
 
 

Political history of Massachusetts
Massachusetts legislative sessions
massachusetts
1951 in Massachusetts
massachusetts
1952 in Massachusetts